In addition to the extinct genus Archaeopteryx, the term can refer to the following subjects:

Science
Specimens of Archaeopteryx
9860 Archaeopteryx - a main belt asteroid 
Archaeopteryx (software) - a phylogenetic tree software

Technology
Granger Archaeopteryx - a British semi-tailless aeroplane of the 1930s
Ruppert Archaeopteryx - a Swiss foot-launched sailplane

Culture
Ubu cocu, ou l'Archéopteryx - an 1897 play by Alfred Jarry
Arc'teryx - an outdoor clothing and sporting goods brand
Archaeopteryx, a song in the album Dinosaurchestra by American band Lemon Demon